The border between Eswatini and South Africa is  long; South Africa surrounds Eswatini to the north, west, south and southeast, with Mozambique bordering it on the northeast.

Crossings
The border crossings are listed from north to south in the table below.

References

 
Eswatini
Borders of Eswatini
International borders